José Luis Romero Robledo (born 5 January 1945 in Madrid) is a Spanish former footballer and coach.

Romero played for Villarrobledo, Sabadell, Xerez, Barcelona, Espanyol, Burgos and Sant Andreu.

Romero coached Sabadell, Barcelona (as interim), Real Oviedo, Logroñés, Betis, Cádiz and Atlético Madrid.

References

1945 births
Living people
Footballers from Madrid
Spanish footballers
Association football midfielders
La Liga players
CE Sabadell FC footballers
Xerez CD footballers
FC Barcelona players
RCD Espanyol footballers
Burgos CF (1936) footballers
UE Sant Andreu footballers
Spanish football managers
La Liga managers
CE Sabadell FC managers
FC Barcelona managers
FC Barcelona Atlètic managers
Real Oviedo managers
CD Logroñés managers
Real Betis managers
Cádiz CF managers
Atlético Madrid managers
Gimnàstic de Tarragona managers